Pat Davey (14 April 1913 – 19 July 2006) was an Australian rules footballer who played with Richmond in the Victorian Football League (VFL).

Notes

External links 
		

1913 births
2006 deaths
Australian rules footballers from Victoria (Australia)
Richmond Football Club players